Khangshim is a village in Chandel district of Manipur, India.

References

Villages in Kakching district